Nighttime World Volume 1 is an album by American electronic musician Robert Hood, released in 1995 on Cheap Records. Compared to his previous minimal techno work, the record features influences and elements from jazz, soul and downtempo. Its follow-up record, Nighttime World Volume 2, built upon the style of its predecessor and was released on Hood's M-Plant in 2000.

Background
The record draws upon soul, jazz and downtempo styles, while preserving four-on-the-floor structures on a plethora of tracks; AllMusic critic John Bush described Nighttime World Volume 1 as "practically a soul album." Pitchfork's Andrew Gaerig remarked that the record was "pock-marked with jazz and made sidelong glances at house." On the stylistic change, Hood stated:

Hood has cited jazz artists Joe Sample, The Crusaders, Jean-Luc Ponty and Donald Byrd as influences for mixing different sounds. The album opener "Behind This Door" features a string section, while the track "The Colour of Skin" is led by a piano vamp and hip hop tempo. The latter was "written from the perspective of a black kid growing up in Detroit but looking at the city from a watcher’s point of view." The track "Untitled" was based on a Hood's former track "Moveable Parts", originally released on the namesake 12".

Critical reception

AllMusic critic John Bush labeled the record as "more than just a collection of great tracks" unlike Internal Empire, noting the soul influence and "Hood's growth as a producer not posing a threat to his sound". Bush further described the album as "one of the most inventive full-lengths to come out of Detroit." Matt Miner of Westword described it as a "soulful classic" and "one of the finest electronic-music albums ever to come out of Detroit."

Track listing
All tracks written by Robert Hood.
 "Behind This Door" — 5:05
 "Nighttime World" — 5:25
 "Episode No. 19" — 3:48
 "The Color of Skin" — 3:46
 "Electric Nigger Pt. 1" — 7:56
 "Nighttime" — 4:32
 "Untitled" — 7:24
 "Stark Reality" — 5:47

Personnel
Album personnel as adapted from liner notes:
 Robert Hood — writer, producer
 Manfred Hummel — mastering (credited as HM)

References

External links
 

1995 albums
Robert Hood albums
Downtempo albums